"Moe Letter Blues" is the twenty-first episode of the twenty-first season of the American animated television series The Simpsons. It originally aired on the Fox network in the United States on May 9, 2010. In this episode, Homer, Reverend Lovejoy, and Apu Nahasapeemapetilon receive a letter from Moe stating that he will steal one of their wives. The three get together and try to remember intimate moments between Moe and their wives.

The episode was written by Stephanie Gillis and directed by Matthew Nastuk and guest stars Don Pardo as himself. The main plot of the episode is a parody of A Letter to Three Wives. It is the third episode after season 19's "Mona Leaves-a" and season 20's "Four Great Women and a Manicure" to air on Mother's Day and be centered on mothers and women.

"Moe Letter Blues" received positive reviews from critics and was viewed by 5.66 million households according to the Nielsen Media Research.

Plot
Moe's Tavern is the scene of merry-making for the people of Springfield, and Moe relates how his role as bartender gives him insight into his customers' lives. He notices tension in the marriages of Homer, who argues about what to do for Mother's Day, Apu, who plays a song in the car that Manjula dislikes, and Reverend Lovejoy, who does not want to help Helen because he is playing with a train set. Mother's Day is approaching, and Marge, needing a break from motherhood, suggests that Homer take the children to Weasel Island after Krusty the Clown promotes it on his show. At first Homer is enthusiastic, but becomes concerned when Marge mentions his leaving will allow her to "take care of something". As the ferry to the island pulls away from the dock, the three men receive a letter from Moe informing them that he is running off with one of their wives.

At Weasel Island, the children spend time at a shoddy amusement park while Homer, Apu and Lovejoy agonize over their situation. At first, each insists their marriage is fine. Homer, however, remembers his mother-in-law Jacqueline Bouvier's 80th birthday, where Moe was the bartender. Homer, who was angry at Marge for only serving non-alcoholic beer, got into an argument with Patty and Selma after they started annoying him with their antics. Disgusted, Homer then drove them out, and Marge told him that he ruins every event that she plans. Apu notices cracks in his marriage, recollecting an incident where he and Manjula forgot their son Gheet at Moe's after using the bar's bathroom to change out of rain-soaked cricket whites. Manjula drove back to retrieve their son and did not return for hours. Homer mentions that he saw Manjula playing an interactive dance video game with Moe that night. Finally, Lovejoy remembers advice given to him by the Parson that he ignored his wife Helen's needs, and Apu recounts how he witnessed Moe confiding in Helen that he was in love with a married woman and that Helen put her hand on his knee.

When the ferry returns to the mainland, each man realizes that they are equally likely to have lost their wives to Moe. Otto drops Homer and his kids off first. At first, Homer thinks Marge is packing a suitcase and tries to convince her to stay. Once he comes in, he realizes that she has painted a portrait of her mother. Jacqueline, assures Homer that he was not responsible for the 80th birthday incident. She admits that it is Patty and Selma's fault because there is "something evil" about them (they even smoked during her pregnancy). While watching Homer and Marge make up, both Lovejoy and Apu slump in their seats, thinking it is either Helen or Manjula that left with Moe. When Lovejoy arrives home with Jessica, he too thinks Helen is leaving, but instead she surprises him with tickets to Istanbul on board the Orient Express. By process of elimination, Apu concludes that his wife has left. He arrives home with their octuplets to find Moe sitting with Manjula, but she tells Apu that he convinced her to salvage their marriage.

Moe reveals that he saw how troubling the relationships were, so he organized Marge's portrait, the Lovejoys' trip and the Nahasapeemapetilons' marriage rescue. He also explained that he only wrote the horrible letter just to teach the three men a lesson about taking their wives for granted, saying that they need to value them more just like their other family members. Upon learning this, Homer thanks Moe for teaching him that lesson. In the end, Moe implores viewers to value their wives and mothers this Mother's Day as a montage of Springfield's mothers plays over the 1973 hit "I'll Always Love My Mama"  by The Intruders.

Cultural references
"Moe Letter Blues" served as a parody of the feature film, A Letter to Three Wives. Moe, while narrating the episode, makes a reference to SNL announcer Don Pardo (who then appears in the narration). The title of the episode is a reference to the film Mo' Better Blues, the second one after "Moe Baby Blues," as well as the blues song "Death Letter Blues."

The Itchy and Scratchy cartoon in the episode is a reference to the black and white French film A Trip to the Moon, and includes the song "Maple Leaf Rag" by ragtime composer Scott Joplin.

Moe's voice-over claims he moved to Springfield because the zip code spelled "BOOBS" on a calculator, which would make it "80085", a zip code that, according to the US postal service, is not assigned to any existing town. The music played during the interactive dance video session was Lady Gaga's "Just Dance". The song played during the Wagon scene is "O Mere Sona Re", a Bollywood song written by R.D. Burman and performed by Asha Bhosle, from the 1966 Hindi film soundtrack Teesri Manzil. When Rev. Lovejoy's spiritual adviser sang a song, he mentioned 'Krakatoa, East of Java'.

Otto's state of hallucination makes him see, during the drive from Weasel Island back to Springfield, characters from the Disney Pixar animated film Cars. Apu and Manjula's minivan has an upside down Volkswagen logo. It also bears strong resemblance to the Volkswagen T25. Shortly after the beginning of the episode, Moe advertises his bar by stating that "everybody comes to Moe's", which mirrors the introduction of Rick's Café in Casablanca.

Reception
In its original American broadcast, "Moe Letter Blues" was viewed by an estimated 5.660 million households, received a 2.7 rating/9 share in the 18-49 demographic tying with last week, coming second in its time slot losing to the season finale of The Amazing Race and becoming the third highest rated show on "Animation Domination".

The episode received mainly positive reviews.

TVFanatic.com gave the episode 3.5/5 and stated "The flashbacks definitely had some hilarious moments including a thousand devils d'ohing on Homer's shoulder.  Moe was fantastic as a narrator and even better when he took advantage of his omniscient point of view."

Robert Canning of IGN.com gave the episode 8.4/10 and remarked "One issue I did have with the episode was Moe's, 'I'm leaving town forever and taking one of your wives' statement in his letter. You know there's no way Moe would ever be leaving the series or running off with any of these women, so the claim never held any drama. It might have worked better if Moe had simply said he was going to sleep with one of the women. This would have been a little more believable in the realm of the series and certainly would have been more in line with Moe's character. That aside, however, the storytelling and humor delivered yet another great episode."

Sharon Knolle of TV Squad said that "The Mother's Day-themed Simpsons episode can't compare to last week's — one of the best in years — but it was a pleasant enough outing", he also said Apu had some of the best lines in the episode.

Emily VanDerWerff of The A.V. Club gave the episode a B,  stating that "the core of the episode is solid, and Moe makes a very funny narrator."

Hank Azaria was nominated for Primetime Emmy Award for Outstanding Voice-Over Performance for voicing Apu Nahasapeemapetilon and Moe Szyslak in the episode.

Additionally, Stephanie Gillis was nominated for a Writers Guild of America Award for Outstanding Writing in Animation at the 63rd Writers Guild of America Awards for her script to this episode.

References

External links

"Moe Letter Blues" at TheSimpsons.com
"Moe Letter Blues" at The Simpsons Archive

2010 American television episodes
The Simpsons (season 21) episodes